Sadeq Ganji (died 1990) was the Iranian Consul General to Pakistan, and director of the Iran-Pakistan Cultural Center.

Ganji was killed by suspected Sunni militants in 1990, allegedly for propagating Shia revolutionary ideology through the Cultural Center, though it is also theorised the assassination was revenge for the killing of Sunni militant Haq Nawaz Jhangvi earlier that year.

In March 2001, Sipah-e-Sahaba Pakistan member Sheikh Haq Nawaz Jhangvi was convicted and hanged by a Pakistani court for the assassination.

References

Assassinated Iranian politicians
Terrorism deaths in Pakistan
1990 deaths
Year of birth missing
Iranian expatriates in Pakistan
Assassinated Iranian diplomats